The Kandym–Khausak–Shady–Kungrad project is a project to develop natural gas fields in Uzbekistan. The project is carried out by consortium of Lukoil (90%) and the Uzbekneftegaz (10%).

History 

The production sharing agreement on the project was signed between Lukoil and Uzbekneftegaz on 16 June 2004 in Tashkent in the presence of the presidents of Russia and Uzbekistan. The agreement came into force on 24 November 2004 and will be in force until 2039. Output is to be shared on a fifty-fifty basis.

On 8 September 2005, the agreement on creating a consortium comprising Uzbekneftegaz, Lukoil, Petronas, Korea National Oil Corporation and China National Petroleum Corporation was signed in Tashkent. However, this agreement is not implemented.

The drilling of development wells in the Khausak gas field started on 1 July 2006. The Khausak field was inaugurated on 29 November 2007.

In March 2012, Lukoil signed a deal with a consortium of banks for a loan of up to US$500 million for the development.

Development 

References 

Natural gas fields in Uzbekistan
Lukoil oil and gas fields